The Lookout  (translit. Shuroo) is a 1990 Israeli comedy film directed by Savi Gabizon. It stars Moshe Ivgy, Moshe Ferster, and Keren Mor. The film is about a "small-time con man who becomes a guru". Critically acclaimed, it won the Ophir Award for Best Film and garnered numerous Best Actor awards for Ivgy at the Israeli Academy Awards and Haifa Film Festival. It was submitted by Israel to the Academy Awards.

Cast 
 Shmuel Edelman  
 Moshe Ferster as Moshe
 Sharon Hacohen
 Moshe Ivgy 
 Ezra Kafri 
 Keren Mor as Shimrit

Reception
The film was submitted by Israel for the Academy Award for Best Foreign Language Film at the 63rd Academy Awards, but was not selected.

See also
 List of submissions to the 63rd Academy Awards for Best Foreign Language Film
 List of Israeli submissions for the Academy Award for Best Foreign Language Film

References

External links 
 "The Lookout" - The full film is available on VOD on the website for the Israel Film Archive - Jerusalem Cinematheque
 

1990 films
Israeli comedy films
1990 comedy films
1990s Hebrew-language films